Geoff Gray (born November 8, 1994) is a professional Canadian football offensive lineman for the Winnipeg Blue Bombers of the Canadian Football League (CFL). He was drafted eighth overall in the 2017 CFL Draft by the Blue Bombers. He played U Sports football for the Manitoba Bisons.

Professional career

Green Bay Packers
Gray signed with the Green Bay Packers as an undrafted free agent on May 5, 2017. He was waived by the Packers on September 2, 2017.

New York Jets
On September 4, 2017, Gray was signed to the New York Jets' practice squad.

Cleveland Browns
On December 13, 2017, Gray was signed by the Cleveland Browns off the Jets' practice squad. He was waived on August 28, 2018.

Winnipeg Blue Bombers
On October 15, 2018, Gray signed with the Winnipeg Blue Bombers through to the 2020 CFL season. He played in his first professional game on November 3, 2018 against the Edmonton Eskimos, which was his only game played that year. In the 2019 season, he started the first 12 games of the season as Winnipeg began with a 9–3 record. After Patrick Neufeld returned from injury, Gray was a back-up offensive linemen and spent most of the remainder of the season on the injured list. Despite not playing in the 107th Grey Cup, Gray became a Grey Cup champion after the Blue Bombers defeated the Hamilton Tiger-Cats in the title game.

Gray signed a one-year contract extension with the Blue Bombers on January 8, 2021.

References

External links
Winnipeg Blue Bombers bio
Manitoba Bisons bio

1994 births
Living people
Canadian players of American football
Canadian football people from Winnipeg
American football offensive guards
Manitoba Bisons football players
Green Bay Packers players
New York Jets players
Cleveland Browns players
Winnipeg Blue Bombers players
Canadian football offensive linemen
Players of Canadian football from Manitoba